Petite symphonie concertante, Op. 54, is an orchestral composition by the Swiss composer Frank Martin, one of his best-known works.

Martin received the commission for the work in 1944, though progress was delayed by work on the oratorio In Terra Pax. The Petite symphonie concertante was completed the following year and received its premiere in Zurich on May 27, 1946, under the direction of Paul Sacher, who is also the work's dedicatee. Sacher's commission prompted Martin to assume the unusual ensemble of harp, harpsichord, piano and string orchestra divided into two groups, though all accounts suggest the final choice of instruments was the composer's own. Using all of the common stringed instruments available, Martin desired to use the harp, harpsichord and piano not as accompanying, or 'basso continuo' instruments (as is often their role) but as solos, thus being a distant echo of J.S. Bach's Brandenburg Concerto No. 5, and justifying the work's title of symphonie concertante. The work gained Martin international recognition.

The Petite symphonie concertante is in two movements, separated by the briefest of pauses. Each movement may then be divided into two 'halves', though the relationship between each part differs considerably between the two: the first comprises a slow introduction of forty-six bars out of which the following Allegro derives all of its motivic material; the second begins with an Adagio which showcases the three solo instruments (harp, piano, then harpsichord) before breaking into a lively march.

The work is Neoclassical in outlook, and his approach reflects Martin's adoration of Bach. Martin's style draws elements from both the musical styles and traditions of France (such as the use of harmony to create local colour and the freer formal organisation) and Austro-Germany (such as the generally polyphonic style and the dense motivicism). The work also demonstrates Martin's use of the 12-tone technique, though in an entirely different way from the composers of the Second Viennese School. A 12-note row is apparent at the opening of the first movement, though Martin treats it as he does any other thematic or motivic material: it appears in various transpositions (all twelve, if fragmentary statements are included) but is never used in inversion, retrograde or retrograde-inversion forms, and is by no means present throughout the work. The row also demonstrates some other characteristic features of the composer's 12-tone technique, including the use of constant rhythmic values, no octave transpositions within the series, and the row's use frequently as an accompanimental ostinato. Later in the movement however, Martin does demonstrate his own take on the technique, common in the music of Arnold Schoenberg, Anton Webern and others, of 'telescoping' his row forms, that is, the final note of one statement is also the first of the next at a different transposition, though unlike these composers, Martin only uses fragments of each row form.

The piece was intended for the so-called "revival harpsichord", the large early-20th-century instruments built in the piano tradition by makers such as Robert Goble and Pleyel. It is one of the few pieces in the sinfonia concertante genre to be composed in the twentieth century. Fearing that the unusual instrumentation of the "Petite symphonie concertante" might limit performances, Martin later rescored the work for a conventional large orchestra (without solo instruments) as the "Symphonie concertante".

Selected recordings
Original version
 RIAS-Symphonie Orchester, Ferenc Fricsay (Deutsche Grammophon), recorded 1950
 Suisse Romande Orchestra, Ernest Ansermet (Decca), 1951
 Symphony Orchestra, Leopold Stokowski (EMI), 1957
 Suisse Romande Orchestra, composer (Jecklin), 1970
 Academy of St Martin in the Fields, Neville Marriner (EMI), 1978
 NDR-Sinfonie Orchester, Günter Wand  (RCA Victor), 1984
 Suisse Romande Orchestra, Armin Jordan (Erato), 1991

Rescored version
 London Philharmonic Orchestra, Matthias Bamert (Chandos), 1993

References
David Ewen, Encyclopedia of Concert Music.  New York; Hill and Wang, 1959.

Concertante symphonies
1945 compositions
Compositions by Frank Martin
Harp concertos
Compositions for piano and orchestra
Martin
Music dedicated to Paul Sacher